The Westover Air Force Base Hospital is a former hospital at Westover Air Force Base. With the closure of the base in 1974, the hospital closed. The buildings were torn down in the early 1990s.

See also
 List of military installations in Massachusetts

References

External links
Information on returning POWs from Vietnam arriving at the base

Hospitals in Hampshire County, Massachusetts
Chicopee, Massachusetts
Installations of the United States Air Force in Massachusetts
Military hospitals in the United States
Medical installations of the United States Air Force
Defunct hospitals in Massachusetts
Demolished buildings and structures in Massachusetts